Boignée is a village of Wallonia and a district of the municipality of Sombreffe, located in the province of Namur, Belgium.

Previously its own municipality, a 1977 fusion of the Belgian municipalities made it an ancienne commune of Sombreffe. Boignée is on the banks of the river Ligny.

History
The village of Boignée was a location taken up and defended by the Prussian army during the Battle of Ligny on 16 June 1815.

References

External links

Former municipalities of Namur (province)
Battle of Ligny locations